Candock may refer to:

Horsetail
Water Lily